Adrijana Mori (born 17 August 2000) is a Slovenian footballer who plays as a forward for Carl Zeiss Jena in the Frauen Bundesliga and has appeared for the Slovenia women's national team.

Career
Mori has been capped for the Slovenia national team, appearing for the team during the 2019 FIFA Women's World Cup qualifying cycle.

References

External links
 Adrijana Mori at UEFA
 
 

2000 births
Living people
Sportspeople from Slovenj Gradec 
Slovenian women's footballers
Women's association football forwards
Slovenian expatriate footballers
Slovenian expatriate sportspeople in Germany
Expatriate women's footballers in Germany
Slovenia women's international footballers
1. FFC Turbine Potsdam players
FF USV Jena players